Jonathan Olivier Permal (born 15 January 1994 in Flacq District) is a Mauritian track and field athlete competing in the 100 metres and 200 metres. At the 2013 Jeux de la Francophonie, he won a bronze medal in the 200 m. He also reached the semifinals of both the 100 m and 200 m at the 2014 African Athletics Championships in Marrakech, Morocco.

Permal is currently the third fastest Mauritian sprinter in the 200 m with a time of 20.85 seconds after Stephan Buckland's 20.06 and Eric Milazar's 20.66. He is currently the fastest man actively competing for Mauritius.

Personal bests

International competition record

References

External links



Living people
1994 births
Mauritian male sprinters
Commonwealth Games competitors for Mauritius
Athletes (track and field) at the 2014 Commonwealth Games
People from Flacq District